The Georgia Southern Eagles softball team represents Georgia Southern University in NCAA Division I college softball.  The team participates in the Sun Belt Conference. The Eagles are currently led by first-year head coach Sharon Perkins. The team plays its home games at Eagle Field at GS Softball Complex located on the university's campus.

References

Sun Belt Conference softball